The 1962–63 Hellenic Football League season was the tenth in the history of the Hellenic Football League, a football competition in England.

Premier Division

The Premier Division featured 13 clubs which competed in the division last season, along with three new clubs:
Botley United, promoted from Division One
Lambourn Sports, promoted from Division One
Newbury Town, joined from the Metropolitan League

League table

Division One

The Division One featured 9 clubs which competed in the division last season, along with 5 new clubs:
Newbury Town reserves, relegated from the Premier Division
Kidlington, relegated from the Premier Division
Thatcham, relegated from the Premier Division
Amersham Town, joined from the London League
Morris Motors

League table

References

External links
 Hellenic Football League

1962-63
H